Pusionella is a genus of sea snails, marine gastropod mollusks in the family Clavatulidae.

Description
The fusiform shell is solid, smooth and shining, with numerous whorls. The spire is sharp. The lip lacks an anal sinus. The siphonal canal is short, and exteriorly carinated at the base. The columella is twisted anteriorly. The operculum has a lateral nucleus. The eyes are located at the external bases of the tentacles.

Distribution
This genus occurs off the western coast of Africa.

Species
Species within the genus Pusionella include:
 Pusionella buccinata (Lamarck, 1822)
 Pusionella compacta Strebel, 1914
 Pusionella ghanaensis Boyer & Ryall, 2006
 Pusionella lirata Adams A., 1853
 Pusionella lupinus (Philippi, 1850)
 Pusionella nifat (Bruguiere, 1789)
 † Pusionella pseudofusus (Desmoulins, 1842) (fossil in depositis from the Miocene, Burdigalian, Graves near Bordeaux, France) 
 Pusionella rapulum Tryon, 1884
 Pusionella remorata Sykes, 1905
 Pusionella valida (Dunker, 1852)
 Pusionella vulpina (Born, 1780)
Species brought into synonymy
 Pusionella aculeiformis (Lamarck, 1822): synonym of Perrona aculeiformis (Lamarck, 1816)
 Pusionella albocincta (Petit de la Saussaye, 1851): synonym of Pusionella nifat (Bruguière, 1789)
 Pusionella catelini (Petit de la Saussaye, 1851) accepted as Perrona aculeiformis (Lamarck, 1816)
 Pusionella grandis A. Adams, 1853 : synonym of Pusionella valida (Dunker, 1852)
 Pusionella haasi Dautzenberg, 1912: synonym of Pusionella valida (Dunker, 1852)
 Pusionella kraepelini Strebel, 1914: synonym of  Clavatula kraepelini (Strebel, 1914)
 Pusionella milleti milleti (Petit de la Saussaye, 1851)  : synonym of Clavatula milleti (Petit de la Saussaye, 1851) 
 Pusionella milleti subgranulatus (Petit de la Saussaye, 1851): synonym of Clavatula milleti (Petit de la Saussaye, 1851)
 Pusionella rafel Pallary, P., 1920: synonym of  Pusionella vulpina (Born, 1780)
 Pusionella recurvirostris Marrat, 1877 accepted as Pusionella aculeiformis (Lamarck, 1816) accepted as Perrona aculeiformis (Lamarck, 1816)
 Pusionella scripta Nordsieck, 1975: synonym of Mitrella broderipi (G.B. Sowerby I, 1844)
 Pusionella testabilis Jousseaume, 1896: synonym of Daphnella rissoides (Reeve, 1843)

References

 Petit R.E. (2012) John Edward Gray (1800-1875): his malacological publications and molluscan taxa. Zootaxa 3214: 1-125. page(s): 137; note: type species fixation under Art. 70.3

External links
 Gray, J. E. (1847). A list of the genera of recent Mollusca, their synonyma and types. Proceedings of the Zoological Society of London. (1847) 15: 129-219.
 Bouchet, P.; Kantor, Y. I.; Sysoev, A.; Puillandre, N. (2011). A new operational classification of the Conoidea (Gastropoda). Journal of Molluscan Studies. 77(3): 273-308